Jorge Luis Gabrich (born October 14, 1963) is an Argentinian former professional footballer who played in the 1983 FIFA World Youth Championship and won second place in the tournament he also received the Bronze Boot award for his performance.

Career
Born in Chovet, Santa Fe, Gabrich began playing professional football with local side Newell's Old Boys at age 16.

Following his performance at the 1983 youth championship, Gabrich signed for Spanish La Liga side FC Barcelona. However, due to limits on the number of foreign players in the squad, he began playing for the "B" side and would make only two La Liga appearances for the club following an injury to Diego Maradona.

Gabrich would later play in the French league and then in Mexico before returning to Argentina to play for Newell's again. He retired at age 32.

Honours
UAG
 Mexican First Division: 1993–94

References

External links 
 
 
 

1963 births
Living people
Argentine footballers
Argentine people of Croatian descent
Argentine expatriate footballers
Argentina under-20 international footballers
Argentina youth international footballers
Newell's Old Boys footballers
Club Atlético Vélez Sarsfield footballers
Instituto footballers
FC Barcelona players
Stade de Reims players
Irapuato F.C. footballers
C.D. Veracruz footballers
Tecos F.C. footballers
La Liga players
Ligue 2 players
Liga MX players
Expatriate footballers in Spain
Expatriate footballers in France
Expatriate footballers in Mexico
Association football forwards
Sportspeople from Santa Fe Province